Fernando Butazzoni (born 1953) is a Uruguayan novelist and journalist. Translated into a dozen languages, he is winner of many international awards for literature and cinema. In 1979, at the age of 25, he won the Casa de las Américas Literature Award. The Mexican writer and screenwriter Guillermo Arriaga described his work as "A pretty fucking powerful look at the relationship between life and death".

Career

His first novel, The open night, was awarded by the Confederation of Universities of Central America with the Latin American Narrative Award EDUCA, in 1981. His works have been translated into English, French, Portuguese, Swedish, Italian, Rumanian Russian and others languages.

In the Columbia Guide to the Latin America Novel... (2007), Raymond Williams wrote about his novel Prince of death: "Is a vast historical work set in nineteenth century". Alexandra Falek, in her thesis The Fiction of Afterwards(New York University, 2007), emphasized that the Butazzoni's work is "an example of testimonial fiction".

In 2009, director José Ramón Novoa filmed his novel "A distant place". The film starred Erich Wildpret and Marcela Kloosterboer.

The film God's Slave (2013), written by Fernando Butazzoni, directed by Joel Novoa, has won several international film awards (in Huelva, Santa Barbara, Lleida, among others). The film was described as "riveting" by Anath White.

In 2014, Planeta Group published "Ashes of Condor", an extensive report about terrorism in Latin America. The Uruguayan Book Chamber granted it the Bartolomé Hidalgo Award 2014 during the International Book Fair in Montevideo.

In 2016, Mario Vargas Llosa put the book Ashes of Condor on the short list of his Hispano-American Bienal, and Casa de las Américas granted it with the José María Arguedas Award.

Bibliography

1979, Los días de nuestra sangre (short stories) 
1981, La noche abierta (novel)
1983, Con el ejército de Sandino (chronic)
1986, El tigre y la nieve (novel)
1986, Nicaragua: news of war (chronic) 
1987, Dance of the Lost (novel)
1997, Prince of Death (novel)
2004, Lautréamont Kingdom (essay)
2009, Imperfect Prophet (novel)
2009, A distant place (novel)
2014, Las cenizas del Cóndor (novel)
2016, La vida y los papeles (chronic)
2017, Una historia americana (novel)

Filmography (as writer)

2002, Seregni-Rosencof 
2010, A distant place (Avalon-Alpeh-Joel Films)
2013, God' Slave (Joel Films)
2014, Solo (Unity Films)
2016, Tamara (Unity Films, Joel Films)

References

External links
 Official Website
 

1953 births
Uruguayan novelists
Male novelists
Uruguayan male writers
Living people
Uruguayan journalists
Writers from Montevideo
Premio Bartolomé Hidalgo